Xavier Jan (born 2 June 1970) is a former French racing cyclist. He rode in 3 editions of the Tour de France and 1 Vuelta a España.

Career highlights

Major results

1991
 3rd Overall Ruban Granitier Breton
1994
 1st  Overall Ronde de l'Isard
1995
 1st Stage 10 Mi-Août Bretonne
 3rd Overall Ronde de l'Isard
1997
 2nd Polymultipliée Hautil
 3rd Grand Prix de Plumelec-Morbihan
 4th Milano–Torino
 7th Japan Cup
 8th Trophée des Grimpeurs
1999
 4th Japan Cup
2000
 7th Tour du Finistère
2001
 1st  Overall Ster Elektrotoer
 3rd Tour du Finistère
2002
 1st Grand Prix d'Ouverture La Marseillaise
 7th Overall Volta ao Algarve

Grand Tour general classification results timeline

References

1970 births
Living people
People from Dinan
French male cyclists
Sportspeople from Côtes-d'Armor
Cyclists from Brittany